Gentleman John, Gentleman Johnny, or Gentleman Jonathan may refer to:

Gentleman John:
Johnny Enzmann (1890–1984), American  Major League Baseball pitcher
John Harris (footballer)  (1917–1988), Scottish footballer
John Jackson (English boxer) (1769–1845), English boxer
John Palmer (actor) (1742?–1798), English actor
John L. Rotz (1934–2021), American jockey
John Sattler (born 1942), Australian rugby league footballer of the 1960s and 1970s

Gentleman Johnny:
John Burgoyne (1722–1792), British Army general in the American Revolutionary War
Johnny Ramensky (1905–1972), Scottish career criminal and Second World War British Army commando

Gentleman Jonathan
"Gentleman" Jonathan Sayers, a professional wrestling manager from All- Star Wrestling

Fictional characters:
"Gentleman" Johnny Marcone; see List of The Dresden Files characters

Lists of people by nickname